The Tulsa Police Department (TPD) is the principal law enforcement agency for the city of Tulsa, Oklahoma, United States. It is nationally accredited by the Commission on Accreditation for Law Enforcement Agencies It is the second largest municipal law enforcement agency in Oklahoma.

TPD was officially organized in 1907 after the City of Tulsa was incorporated. However, informally, TPD existed as early as 1905.

Organizational structure

The Chief of Police supervises three deputy chiefs who are each in charge of a bureau. A bureau consist of three to four divisions. Each division is supervised by a major.  The Chief of Police reports to the mayor.

Tulsa Police Department
 Chief's Office
 Administration Bureau
Information and Technical Services
Training Division
Headquarters
Forensic Lab
 Investigations Bureau
Detective Division
Special Investigations Division
Fleet Operations
 Operations Bureau
 Mingo Valley Division
 Gilcrease Division
 Riverside Division
 Special Operations Division

Support units include:
 Air Support
 K9
 Special Operations Team (SOT)
 Bike Patrol
 Motorcycle Patrol
 Bomb Squad
 Special Investigations Unit 
 Cyber-Crimes Unit
 Dive Team

Personnel
Tulsa Police department employs personnel from a diverse range of racial, educational and socioeconomic backgrounds. Proportionally, there is significantly greater representation of Caucasian, Native-American and male employees in the department compared with the general population of Tulsa.

Non-sworn Personnel
Staff generally require a GED or high school diploma. Specialized experience and training is also required for specific roles, such as administrative assistants.

Sworn-officers
Sworn-officers are required to have at least a four-year bachelor's degree to apply, generally with a background in forensic science or criminal justice. TPD has no inbound transfer program for existing law enforcement officers so all candidates must complete a six-month training course at the Tulsa Police Academy regardless of previous law enforcement experience.

In 2015 The department had 752 sworn-officers with an independent recommendation from Cincinnati University that the city hire an additional 206 officers because, for some time, "The police department is operating at a serious staffing deficiency." In order to meet federally recommended staffing levels to manage shift fatigue, it was recommended that the city should have 1,264 sworn-officers and should more than quadruple the number of civilian administrative staff in order to satisfy standard staffing practices. Funding has remained stagnant with funding levels for 2015 of US$96 million to the same total in 2018. As of 2019, there is a projection of 913 sworn officers and 50 administrative staff by the end of 2019 financial year.

Despite the shortage of staff, off-duty sworn-officers of the TPD are highly sought after as private security guards within the region, servicing various businesses from municipal transport services, local hospitals and banks, to convenience stores such as QuikTrip. Many officers have been moonlighting for several decades due to the lucrative private security industry.

Chief of Police
Wendell Franklin was appointed police chief of the city of Tulsa, Oklahoma by Mayor G. T. Bynum On February 1, 2020, following the retirement of the previous chief Chuck Jordan. Chief Franklin is the city's 40th police chief and the city's 1st African-American police chief. Chief Franklin has been with the department for 23 years and is known for his attempts to lower crime rate and increase community relations. Chief Franklin graduated the FBI National Academy in 2016 and returned to Tulsa.

Police chiefs

 Herman F. Newblock (August 8, 1907 – October 1, 1908)
 Jess Sam Walker (October 13, 1908 – February 24, 1909)
 Hirsam A. Thompson (February 25, 1909 – May 4, 1910)
 Charles W. Conneely (May 5, 1910 – May 3, 1912)
 Herman F. Newblock (January 16, 1911 – May 3, 1912)
 Edward Yoder (May 5, 1912 – May 3, 1914)
 Foster Nathaniel Burns (May 4, 1914 – November 12, 1915)
 Rees D. Moran (November 13, 1915 – May 2, 1916)
 Ed L. Lucas (May 2, 1916 – May 25, 1918)
 Charles E. Allen (May 30, 1918 – April 26, 1920)
 John A. Gustafson (April 27, 1920 – June 25, 1921)
 George H. Blaine (July 24, 1921 – April 26, 1922)
 Rees D. Moran (April 27, 1922 – April 30, 1928)
 John H. Vickrey (May 1, 1928 – March 31, 1929)
 George H. Blaine (April 1, 1929 – May 5, 1930)
 A. Garland Marrs (May 6, 1930 – February 9, 1931)
 Nelson J. Moore (February 9, 1931 – April 29, 1932)
 J.W. Townsend (April 30, 1932–Jun 5, 1934) 
 Charles F. Carr (May 6, 1934 – May 5, 1936)
 Roy Hyatt (May 6, 1936 – May 3, 1938)
 L. Randolph House (May 3, 1938 – May 6, 1940)
 Ralph Colvin (May 7, 1940 – November 7, 1941)
 George H. Blaine (November 7, 1941 – May 3, 1943)
 Richard Bland Jones (May 3, 1943 – May 2, 1944)
 Roy Hyatt (May 2, 1944 – May 4, 1948)
 J.W. "Bud" Hollinsworth (May 4, 1948 – May 2, 1950)
 Fred Graves (May 2, 1950 – May 6, 1952)
 George O'Neal (May 6, 1952 – April 1, 1953)
 Joe McGuire (May 3, 1953 – April 30, 1956)
 Paul Livingston (May 8, 1956 – February 22, 1957)
 George O'Neal (February 22, 1957 – July 15, 1957)
 Joe McGuire (July 15, 1957 – July 31, 1962)
 George John "Jack" Purdie (August 1, 1962 – February 28, 1978)
 Harry William Stege (March 1, 1978 – November 30, 1983)
 Robert N. Dick (December 1, 1983 – September 30, 1987)
 Drew Diamond (December 11, 1987 – November 15, 1991)
 Ronald Palmer (August 22, 1992 – August 31, 2002)
 David D. Been (November 11, 2002 – April 30, 2007)
 Ronald Palmer (August 2007–January 2010)
 Chuck Jordan (January 29, 2010 – February 1, 2020)
 Wendell Franklin (February 1, 2020–present)

Misconduct

In May–June 1921, the department was key in the Tulsa race massacre when it deputized a mob and directed white citizens to "Get a gun, and get busy and try to get a nigger." Perhaps three hundred Blacks were killed.

In late 2011 four Tulsa police officers were convicted of stealing money from crime scenes and planting drugs at others. As a result of these actions, dozens of convictions had to be thrown out. The ringleader, Corporal Harold R. Wells, was sentenced to ten years in confinement. On 2012, when offered immunity, Wells testified drug arrests twenty years before were also tainted.

In 2013, Officer Marvin Blades Jr was sentenced to 35 years in prison for the armed robbery of Hispanics during traffic stops. 

Officer Shannon Kepler was convicted in 2022 for the 2014 murder of his daughter’s boyfriend. 

In June 2020, during worldwide protests against the killing in Minneapolis of an unarmed black man, Major Travis Yates  pointed out on a radio talk show that it was unreasonable to expect  "... our shootings should be right along the U.S. Census lines." He noted that, "All of the research says we're shooting African-Americans about 24% less than we probably ought to be, based on the crimes being committed." In March 2021, the Tulsa Police internal affairs department determined that claims of misconduct against Major Yates were unsubstantiated. In August 2020, Major Yates filed a defamation lawsuit against Comcast/NBCUniversal, Gannett/USA Today, and Tulsa Public Radio.

Equipment

Vehicles
Dodge Charger
Ford Crown Victoria Police Interceptor
Ford Taurus
Ford Explorer Police Interceptor
Freightliner MT55 (special use)
Modified Alvis FV 603 Saracen (special use)

Weapons
Tulsa Police officers carry the Glock 22 Gen 4 .40 S&W semi-automatic handgun. Officers were previously issued the Glock Model 22C Gen 3 .40 S&W. In 2019, TPD began issuing officers Glock 17 Gen 5 9×19mm sidearms.

See also

 Roy Belton lynched in 1920
 Tulsa race massacre 1921
 Shooting of Terence Crutcher 2016
 Clinton Riggs innovative police chief
 List of law enforcement agencies in Oklahoma
 Tulsa County, Oklahoma

References

External links
Official Website
 TPDD.org—Independent site with Tulsa Police Department statistics
Tulsa Police Officer Memorial

Municipal police departments of Oklahoma
Government of Tulsa, Oklahoma